Jean Louis Barthou (25 August 1862 – 9 October 1934) was a French politician of the Third Republic who served as Prime Minister of France for eight months in 1913. In social policy, his time as prime minister saw the introduction (in July 1913) of allowances to families with children.

In 1917 and in 1934, Barthou also served as Minister of Foreign Affairs.

Early life
Louis Barthou was born on 25 August 1862 in Oloron-Sainte-Marie, Pyrénées-Atlantiques, France.

Career
Barthou served as a  deputy from his home constituency and was an authority on trade-union history and law.

He served as prime minister from 22 March 1913 to 9 December 1913. In social policy, Barthou's time as prime minister saw the passage of a law in June 1913 aimed at safeguarding women workers before and after childbirth.

He also held ministerial office on 13 other occasions. He served as Foreign Minister in 1917 and 1934. He was the primary figure behind the Franco-Soviet Treaty of Mutual Assistance of 1935, but it was signed by his successor, Pierre Laval. As a national World War I hero and a recognized author, Barthou was elected to the Académie française at the end of that war.

In 1934 he tried to create an Eastern Pact, which would have included Germany (in some proposals) the Soviet Union, Poland, Czechoslovakia and the Baltic states on the basis of guarantees - of the European borders of the Soviet Union by France, and of the eastern borders of Nazi Germany by the Soviet Union. He succeeded in obtaining the entry of the Soviet Union into the League of Nations in September 1934. In response to the withdrawal of Nazi Germany from the League in 1933, he began a program of rearmament, which focused initially on the  Navy and the Air Force. 

Barthou was a lover of the arts, and in power he worked with leaders of the arts to publicize their fields. He felt that world-class leadership in the arts made Paris a mecca for tourists and collectors, and enhanced the nation's stature worldwide as the exemplar of truth and beauty. In turn, the arts community honoured Barthou by dubbing him the "minister of poets".

Death
As Foreign Minister, Barthou met King Alexander I of Yugoslavia during his state visit to Marseille in October 1934. On 9 October, King Alexander was assassinated by Velicko Kerin, a Bulgarian far-right nationalist terrorist wielding a handgun. Another bullet struck Barthou in the arm, passing through and fatally severing an artery. He died of blood-loss less than an hour later. The assassination had been planned in Rome by Ante Pavelić, head of the Croatian Ustaše, in August 1934. Pavelić was assisted by Georg Percevic, a former Austro-Hungarian Armed Forces officer. France unsuccessfully requested the extradition of Percevic and Pavelić. This assassination ended the careers of the  Bouches-du-Rhone prefect, and of the director of the Surete Nationale, Jean Berthoin.

A ballistic report on the bullets found in the car was made in 1935, but its results were not made available to the public until 1974. The report revealed that Barthou had been hit by an 8 mm Modèle 1892 revolver round, commonly used in weapons carried by French police. Thus Barthou was killed during the frantic police response, rather than by the assassin.

Legacy
The deaths of Barthou and the King led to the Convention for the Prevention and Punishment of Terrorism concluded at Geneva by the League of Nations on 16 November 1937. The Convention was signed by 25 nations, ratified only by India. Barthou was granted a state funeral four days after his demise.

Ministries

Barthou's ministry, 22 March 1913 – 9 December 1913 
 Louis Barthou – President of the Council and Minister of Public Instruction and Fine Arts
 Stéphen Pichon – Minister of Foreign Affairs
 Eugène Étienne – Minister of War
 Louis Lucien Klotz – Minister of the Interior
 Charles Dumont – Minister of Finance
 Henry Chéron – Minister of Labour and Social Security Provisions
 Antony Ratier – Minister of Justice
 Pierre Baudin – Minister of Marine
 Étienne Clémentel – Minister of Agriculture
 Jean Morel – Minister of Colonies
 Joseph Thierry – Minister of Public Works
 Alfred Massé – Minister of Commerce, Industry, Posts, and Telegraphs

References

Further reading
 Atkin, Nicholas. "Power and Pleasure. Louis Barthou and the Third French Republic." Journal of European Studies 23.91 (1993): 357-359.
 Buffotot, Patrice. "The French high command and the Franco‐Soviet alliance 1933–1939." Journal of Strategic Studies 5.4 (1982): 546-559.
 French, G. "Louis Barthou and the German Question: 1934." Report of the Annual Meeting. Vol. 43. No. 1. 1964. online
 Rife, John Merle. "The political career of Louis Barthou" (PhD. Diss. The Ohio State University, 1964) online.
 Roberts, Allen. The turning point: the assassination of Louis Barthou and King Alexander I of Yugoslavia (1970).
 Schuman, Frederick L. Europe On The Eve 1933-1939 (1939) pp 94–109.online
 Young, Robert J.  Power and Pleasure: Louis Barthou and the Third French Republic (1991)
 Young, Robert J. "Cultural Politics and the Politics of Culture: The Case of Louis Barthou," French Historical Studies (Fall 1991) 17#2 pp. 343–358 online
 Young, Robert J. "A Talent for All Seasons: The Life and Times of Louis Barthou." Queen's Quarterly 98.4 (1991): 846-64; online.

External links
 
 "The King is Dead, Long Live the Balkans! Watching the Marseilles Murders of 1934" The Watson Institute
 

1862 births
1934 deaths
People from Oloron-Sainte-Marie
Politicians from Nouvelle-Aquitaine
Democratic Republican Alliance politicians
Prime Ministers of France
French Foreign Ministers
Transport ministers of France
French Ministers of Public Works, Posts and Telegraphs
French interior ministers
French Ministers of War
Members of the 5th Chamber of Deputies of the French Third Republic
Members of the 6th Chamber of Deputies of the French Third Republic
Members of the 7th Chamber of Deputies of the French Third Republic
Members of the 8th Chamber of Deputies of the French Third Republic
Members of the 9th Chamber of Deputies of the French Third Republic
Members of the 10th Chamber of Deputies of the French Third Republic
Members of the 11th Chamber of Deputies of the French Third Republic
Members of the 12th Chamber of Deputies of the French Third Republic
French Senators of the Third Republic
Senators of Pyrénées-Atlantiques
Members of the Académie Française
1934 murders in France
Assassinated French politicians
Filmed assassinations
Deaths by firearm in France
People murdered in France
Terrorism deaths in France
Burials at Père Lachaise Cemetery
Articles containing video clips